Black Isle Brewery is an organic brewery based in Munlochy, Scotland.

All of their beers are organic and suitable for vegetarians, as they do not use isinglass in the brewing process.

Organic production
The brewery manufactures organic beers using ingredients and produce from its own organic farm and other organic suppliers. The company is heavily involved in the organic movement.

See also
 Scottish Real Ale

References

External links 
 Black Isle Brewery

Breweries in Scotland
Black Isle
Food and drink companies established in 1998